The Firebreak Stakes, is a horse race, for horses aged four and over,  run over a distance of 1,600 metres (one mile) on dirt in February at Meydan Racecourse in Dubai. The race is named in honour of the racehorse Firebreak, who won the Hong Kong Mile for Godolphin in 2004.

The Firebreak Stakes was first contested in 2011 as a Listed race and was elevated to Group 3 level a year later. It was run on a synthetic Tapeta surface before moving to dirt in 2015.

Records
Record time:
 1:35.45 - Tamarkuz 2015

Most successful horse (2 wins):
 no horse has won the race more than once

Most wins by a jockey:
 3 - Mickael Barzalona 2018, 2020, 2022

Most wins by a trainer:

 3 - Salem bin Ghadayer  2018, 2020, 2022
 2 - Saeed bin Suroor 2011, 2012
 2 - Satish Seemar  2017, 2021

Most wins by an owner:
 4 - Godolphin 2011, 2012, 2013, 2016

Winners

See also
 List of United Arab Emirates horse races

References

Horse races in the United Arab Emirates
Recurring events established in 2011
2011 establishments in the United Arab Emirates